Franciele Aparecida do Nascimento (born October 19, 1987 in Jacarezinho, Paraná) is a Brazilian female basketball player. At the 2008 and 2012 Summer Olympics, she competed for the Brazil women's national basketball team in the women's event.

References

Brazilian women's basketball players
1987 births
Living people
Brazilian expatriate basketball people in Spain
Olympic basketball players of Brazil
Basketball players at the 2008 Summer Olympics
Basketball players at the 2012 Summer Olympics